Lachnocnema intermedia is a butterfly in the family Lycaenidae. It is found in Angola, the Democratic Republic of the Congo and north-western Zambia.

References

Butterflies described in 1996
Taxa named by Michel Libert
Miletinae